Marie-Ange Lukiana Mufwankolo, born Mufwankolo, is a politician from the Democratic Republic of Congo. She is the Minister of Gender, Women and Children in the Government Muzito II and also in the government of Muzito III since 11 September 2011.

Biography 
A graduate of the Graduate Institute of Development Studies in Geneva, she is primarily involved in civil society activities for the cause of women. Married to Mr. Lukiana, a university professor, she became deputy general secretary of the People's Party for Reconstruction and Development (PPRD) after having been Minister of Labor and Social Welfare of the Laurent-Desire Kabila government from 2000 to 2001. She then became senator and vice-president of the PPRD. She later became Minister of Labor and Social Welfare of the Gizenga Government. She is currently Minister of Gender and Family of the Muzito I government. She was part of the parliamentary fact-finding committee that investigated the systematic expulsions of Congolese from Republic of Congo Brazzaville, from the Democratic Republic of Congo.

References

External links

Living people
21st-century Democratic Republic of the Congo women politicians
Government ministers of the Democratic Republic of the Congo
Democratic Republic of the Congo expatriates in Switzerland
University of Geneva alumni
Year of birth missing (living people)
Graduate Institute of International and Development Studies alumni
21st-century Democratic Republic of the Congo politicians